Christopher Turner (born 28 May 1958) is a British former motorcycle speedway rider.

Biography
Born in Crewe, Cheshire, Turner took up speedway at the age of fourteen at the training school at Belle Vue. He also competed in grasstrack racing as a junior. He made his competitive debut for Belle Vue in a challenge match in 1974, and in 1975 spent most of the season with Crewe Kings in the National League, also riding in a few matches for Belle Vue. In 1976 he rode for Ellesmere Port Gunners in the National League for ehom he averaged more than nine points per match, as well as riding in the British League for Belle Vue, for whom he averaged over five points. In 1977 and 1878 he was a regular part of Belle Vue's British League team, before signing for Leicester Lions in 1979. He struggled to score well and was loaned to National League Stoke Potters for much of the season, although he was recalled by the Lions later in the season. In 1980 he rode for Boston Barracudas, and also rode for King's Lynn Stars in the British League, although having averaged below three points for the Stars it proved to be his last spell in the top flight. He moved on to Edinburgh Monarchs for whom he rode until his retirement in 1983.

Turner represented England at National League level against Scotland in 1981 and 1982.
He won the National Pairs with Ellesmere in 1976, The National Fours and National KO Cup with Edinburgh in 1981

References

1958 births
Living people
British speedway riders
English motorcycle racers
Sportspeople from Crewe
Belle Vue Aces riders
Crewe Kings riders
Ellesmere Port Gunners riders
Leicester Lions riders
Stoke Potters riders
Boston Barracudas riders
King's Lynn Stars riders
Edinburgh Monarchs riders